Gosnells City Football Club is a football (soccer) club based in Thornlie, Western Australia. The club currently (2022) competes in the Football West State League Division 2.

History
The club was established in 1969, as Gosnells Town Soccer Club, with its home ground at Canning Vale Oval, in the then Shire of Gosnells.
The club moved to Walter Padbury Reserve in 1974, and the council-built clubroom was opened in 1975.

The Club merged in 1993 with Ferndale, changing its name to Gosnells Ferndale United. Kelmscott Roos joined in 1995, and the club reverted to its previous name, and then later became known as Southside United. At the start of the 2004 season the Club changed the team name back to Gosnells City.

External links
 Gosnells City Football Club Official Website

References

Soccer clubs in Perth, Western Australia
Football West State League teams
Association football clubs established in 1969
1969 establishments in Australia